This is a list of yearly Great Lakes Intercollegiate Athletic Conference football standings.

Great Lakes standings

References

Standings
Great Lakes Intercollegiate Athletic Conference